This is a demography of Mongolia including population density, ethnicity, education level, health of the populace, economic status, religious affiliations and other aspects of the population.

Segments

Youth

Vital statistics

UN estimates

Registered births and deaths

Current vital statistics

Life expectancy 

Source: UN World Population Prospects

Structure of the population

Ethnicity and languages 
The demonym for the people of Mongolia is Mongolian. The name Mongol usually accounts for people of the Mongol ethnic group, thus excluding Turkic groups such as Kazakhs and Tuvans.

Ethnic Mongols account for about 96% of the population and consist of Khalkh and other groups, all distinguished primarily by dialects of the Mongolian language. The Khalkhs make up 86% of the ethnic Mongol population. The remaining 14% include Oirats, Buryats and others. Ethnic distinctions among the Mongol subgroups are relatively minor.  Language or tribal differences are not a political or social issue.

Significant ethnic Turkic speaker Kazakhs constitute 3.9% of Mongolia's population. Khotons and Chantuu are Mongolized people with Turkic origin and speak in Mongolian.

In around 1860, part of the Middle jüz Kazakhs who sought refuge from Qing Empire massacre in Xinjiang came to Mongolia and were allowed to settle down in Bayan-Ölgii Province. There are smaller numbers of Russian, Chinese, Korean and American people working in Mongolia since 1990. 3,000 Westerners live in Mongolia, accounting for 0.1% of its total population.

English is the most widely used foreign language followed by Russian. Lately, Chinese, Japanese, Korean and German are gaining popularity.

Ethnicity

Literacy
Literacy rate is the percentage of people over the age of 15 who can read and write.

Total population: 98.3%

After a decline in enrollment ratios during the transition to a market economy in the 1990s, school attendance is now once more near-universal: primary school attendance rate is estimated at 97%, and adult literacy at 98%.

Religions 

Various forms of Shamanism have been widely practiced throughout the history of what is now Mongolia, as such beliefs were common among nomadic people in Asian history. Such beliefs gradually gave way to Tibetan Buddhism, but shamanism has left a mark on Mongolian religious culture, and continues to be practiced.

Traditionally, Tibetan Buddhism was the predominant religion. However, it was suppressed under the communist regime until 1990, with only one showcase monastery allowed to remain. Since 1990, as liberalization began, Buddhism has encountered a resurgence.

Urbanization 
Life in sparsely populated Mongolia has become more urbanized. Nearly half of the people live in the capital, Ulaanbaatar, and in other provincial centers. Semi nomadic life still predominates in the countryside, but settled agricultural communities are becoming more common. Mongolia's population growth rate is estimated at 1.6% (2020 census). About two-thirds of the total population is under age 30, 36% of whom are under 14.

Key: For population growth 1979 - 2008

 Salmon cells indicate that the population has declined or experienced minimal (<1%) growth.
 Light green cells indicate a growth between 1-2%.
 Dark green cells indicate a growth of greater than or equal to 2%.

* - city proper, Nalaikh, Baganuur, Bagakhangai not included in this figure, they are separated in the table.

From List of cities in Mongolia

Base demographic indicators for Mongolia

See also
Mongolian nationality law
Ethnic groups in East Asia
Buddhism in East Asia
Mongolia Human Development Report 1997, UNDP Mongolia Communications Office, Ulaanbaatar, Mongolia 1997

References

 
Society of Mongolia